The 2013–14 Middle Tennessee Blue Raiders women's basketball team represented Middle Tennessee State University during the 2013–14 NCAA Division I women's basketball season. The Blue Raiders, led by 8th year head coach Rick Insell, play their home games at the Murphy Center and are first year members of Conference USA. They were regular season champions of Conference USA and also won the Conference USA tournament to earn an automatic trip to the 2014 NCAA Division I women's basketball tournament, which they lost in the first round to Oregon State.

Roster

Schedule

|-
! colspan="9" style="background:#00407a; color:#fff;"| Exhibition

|-
! colspan="9" style="background:#00407a; color:#fff;"| Regular season

|-
! colspan="9" style="background:#00407a; color:#fff;"| Conference USA Tournament

|-
! colspan="9" style="background:#00407a; color:#fff;"| NCAA tournament

References

Middle Tennessee Blue Raiders women's basketball seasons
Middle Tennessee
Middle Tennessee
Middle Tennessee Blue Raiders
Middle Tennessee Blue Raiders